Iberia Express is a Spanish low-cost airline owned by Iberia, which operates short- and medium-haul routes from its parent airline's hub at Adolfo Suárez Madrid–Barajas Airport, providing feeder flights onto Iberia's long-haul network.

History
IAG announced the launch of Iberia Express on 6 October 2011, leading to strike action by pilots in late December 2011 due to concerns over potential job losses caused by the new airline. Aircraft from other Iberia routes would be switched to the new subsidiary, and new pilots and cabin crew hired to operate the flights. Iberia intended for the new airline to cover routes operated at a loss by the main airline, running with lower operating costs.

Iberia Express began operating on 25 March 2012, sharing its head office with Iberia in Chamartín, Madrid. The new airline began operations with a fleet of four Airbus A320 aircraft, using a two-class Business and Economy configuration.

Destinations
As of September 2020, the following destinations are served by Iberia Express:

Fleet

, the airline's fleet consists of the following aircraft:

References

External links

 Official website

Iberia (airline)
Oneworld affiliate members
Airlines of Spain
Airlines established in 2011
European Low Fares Airline Association
Spanish brands
Spanish companies established in 2011
Low-cost carriers